Fara in Sabina (also shortened to Fara Sabina) is a  (municipality) in the Province of Rieti in the Italian region of Lazio, located about  northeast of Rome and about  southwest of Rieti.

History
The area was inhabited in prehistoric times, as attested by several archaeological findings from the mid-Palaeolithic and late Bronze Ages.

Between the 9th and the 6th centuries BC, a settlement of the Sabines, identified with the city of Cures, existed here, continuing into Roman Empire times. Remains from it include the baths, a small theatre and terraces for agriculture.

The origins of the modern town date from Lombard times (late 6th century AD), as it has been supposed from the presence of the Lombard word fara ("family clan") in the name. A castle is known from 1006 and, from 1050, Fara was a possession of the Abbey of Farfa, which is located in the present municipal territory. Later it was a fief of the Orsini.

During World War II, the POW camp P.G. 54 was located at adjacent Passo Corese.

The main Roman Catholic church is the Duomo Collegiata di Sant'Antonio Martire.

Geography
The municipality  borders with Castelnuovo di Farfa, Montelibretti, Montopoli di Sabina, Nerola and Toffia.

It counts the hamlets of Baccelli, Borgo Quinzio, Canneto Sabino, Coltodino, Corese Terra, Farfa, Passo Corese, Prime Case and Talocci.

International relations

 
Fara in Sabina is twinned with:
  Montelupo Fiorentino, Italy
  Santa Vittoria in Matenano, Italy
  Villemur-sur-Tarn, France

References

External links
 
  

Cities and towns in Lazio